Interporto Futebol Clube, or Interporto, as they are usually called, is a Brazilian football team from Porto Nacional in Tocantins, founded on 13 July 1990.

Interporto is currently ranked third among Tocantins teams in CBF's national club ranking, at 147th place overall.

History
The club was founded on June 13, 1990. Interporto won the Copa Tocantins in 1998, the Campeonato Tocantinense in 1999, and the Campeonato Tocantinense Second Level in 2009. They competed in the Copa do Brasil for the first time in 1999, when they were eliminated in the First Round by Gama, and in 2000, when they were eliminated in the First Round by Bahia.

Honours
 Campeonato Tocantinense
 Winners (4): 1999, 2013, 2014, 2017

 Copa Tocantins
 Winners (1): 1998

 Campeonato Tocantinense Second Division
 Winners (1): 2009

Stadium
Interporto Futebol Clube play their home games at Estádio General Sampaio. The stadium has a maximum capacity of 2,000 people.

References

Interporto Futebol Clube
Football clubs in Tocantins
Association football clubs established in 1990
1990 establishments in Brazil